The Rogozen Treasure, called the find of the century, is a Thracian treasure.

Discovery 

It was discovered by chance in the autumn of 1985 by  tractor driver Ivan Dimitrov, digging a hole for an irrigation system in his garden in the Bulgarian village of Rogozen. On January 6,1986 an archaeological team, consisting of Bogdan Nikolov, Spas Mashov and Plamen Ivanov from the County Historical Museum(Regional Historical Museum) in Vratsa discovered a second half, consisting of 100 silver and gilded silver vessels.

Description 

It consists of 165 receptacles, including 108 phiales, 55 jugs and 3 goblets. The objects are silver with golden gilt on some of them with total weight of more than 20 kg. The treasure is an invaluable source of information for the life of the Thracians, due to the variety of motifs in the richly decorated objects. It is dated back to the 5th–4th centuries B.C.

Gallery

Honour
Rogozen Island off Robert Island, South Shetland Islands is named after the settlement of Rogozen in connection with the Rogozen Treasure.

See also
Panagyurishte Treasure
Valchitran Treasure
Lukovit Treasure
Borovo Treasure

Notes

External links
The Rogozen silver treasure

Sources

 

Treasure troves in Bulgaria
Thracian archaeological artifacts
Treasure troves of classical antiquity
History of Vratsa Province
1985 archaeological discoveries
4th-century BC artefacts
Silver objects